Punchline is an American rock band from Belle Vernon, Pennsylvania, United States, that was formed in 1998. The band released its seventh full-length album, Thrilled, on December 4, 2015, on InVogue Records.

History

1998-2002: early years
Punchline was formed in 1997 as a three-piece band consisting of Steve Soboslai (lead vocals, guitar), Chris Fafalios (bass guitar)  PJ Caruso (drums). At the time, Fafalios was a senior in high school and Caruso and Soboslai were juniors. They played local shows and recorded their first album, How to Get Kicked Out of the Mall, a blend of pop- and ska-influenced punk. In later recordings, the ska influence became less prominent.

In 1999, the band self-produced and self-released the full-length Punchline album.

After being joined by Paul Menotiades (guitar, vocals), they recorded and co-produced Major Motion Picture with Billy Rossi for an August 2001 release. The four collaborated with Rossi again in 2002 on The Rewind EP. The EP's four tracks marked a transition into what became their signature pop-punk sound.

2003-2005: gaining popularity, Fueled by Ramen
In 2003, the band signed to Fueled by Ramen Records. The Rewind EP was remixed and remastered by Shelly Yakus for its Fueled by Ramen re-release. Early pressings included The Rewind Documentary DVD, a collection of footage of the band.

In February 2004, Punchline released the album, Action, produced by Sean O'Keefe. Soboslai, Menotiades and Fafalios all sang on the disc and the first 10,000 pressings also included a DVD entitled The Action DVD.

During a tour, Menotiades left the band. The remaining members enlisted Greg Wood, a long-time friend, to fill in on guitar and vocals for the remaining shows. Wood, who also performed as a solo artist and was a member of the now defunct Connecticut band West Beverly, later joined as a permanent member, and played keyboards and piano in addition to guitar on Punchline's 2006 release 37 Everywhere.

In 2005, TDR Records (formerly known as To Define Records) released an Over It/Punchline split 7-inch vinyl with two exclusive songs. The Over It side has an acoustic version of "Partner in Crime", and the Punchline side has a previously unreleased acoustic version of "Battlescars".

2006: 37 Everywhere
37 Everywhere, produced by Shep Goodman and Kenny Gioia, was released by Fueled by Ramen Records on April 11, 2006. The album is dedicated to the life and times of John "Beatz" Holohan (1974–2005), the former drummer of Bayside.

The album's title refers to a theory suggesting that 37 is the most commonly seen number. The album's liner notes state: "The number 37 is everywhere. It is in your daily routine and it will surprise you. Look for it and it will look for you." Jason Sho Green, the artist/designer for the album, says the liner notes contain 37 instances of the number 37.

The album has guest vocals by Anthony Raneri of the New York band Bayside and Vinnie Caruana of I Am the Avalanche and formerly The Movie Life on "Flashlight", John Johansen of the defunct Stryder on "Caller 10", and Josh Bonner of the defunct Unsung Zeroes on "Wars Will Always Happen", as well as guest guitar work by Ryan Mendez of Yellowcard on "Don't Try This at Home".

On August 28, 2006, the band announced the departure of Wood. Wood is said to be in good standing with the band and left to pursue other interests, specifically a solo career and teaching guitar.

He was replaced by Jon Belan, a long-time Punchline friend and a former member of The Berlin Project and the lead singer of Gene the Werewolf. His first tour with Punchline was the "Better Than Knowing Where You Are Tour", headlined by Spitalfield, with support from Over It, Valencia, Peachcake and Boys Like Girls.

2008: Just Say Yes and Modern Short Stories
Punchline's follow-up to 37 Everywhere was recorded in 2007 in two parts. Part 1 was recorded at Room Sound Studios in Tempe, Arizona, with the producer Jamie Woolford (formerly of The Stereo and now a member of the band Let Go). Part 2 was recorded at Smart Studios in Madison, Wisconsin, with Sean O'Keefe, who had produced Punchline's Action album.

On February 8, 2008, the band announced its departure from Fueled By Ramen in a brief statement:"After many years on fueled by ramen its time for us to move on, after fulfilling the obligations of our contract with FBR we decided that we wanted to look for a new home. Armed with a new record that's already recorded we are excited to move on to something new. Thanks to the people at the FBR that supported us and helped us it means .  closes and one opens."

On July 11, 2008, Punchline created their independent label, Modern Short Stories, using the winnings ($25,000) from Heavy.com's Contraband Contest.

On "37 day" (March 7) 2008, Punchline announced in their AIM chatroom that the new album would be called Just Say Yes. Preceded by "How Does This Happen?", the album was released on September 16, 2008. A four-song bonus disc, Just Say Maybe, was included with the first 500 pre-ordered copies.

2009: more line-up changes and Night Lights
On January 27, 2009, Punchline announced the departure of its long-time drummer and original member Caruso. In a blog entry posted the same day, Soboslai told readers that the split was amicable and announced a temporary stand-in for already scheduled shows. He reassured fans that they planned on making music for a long time to come, and announced plans for a spring 2009 tour and DVD release, as well as a new album.

On May 3, 2009, Punchline premiered their new music video for "Ghostie"

On August 30, 2009, Punchline offered the new song "Heart of Gold" for free download, but those who paid $3 or more received 5 bonus songs, including rare Punchline tracks.

On September 12, 2009, during a hometown show in Pittsburgh on the AbsolutePunk.net Next Favorite Band Tour, Punchline asked the temporary drummer Pat Dee, formerly of the band Victory Lane, to become a permanent member. Punchline announced the departure of Belan later that week. Menotiades returned to replace Belan for the fall 2009 US tour and later rejoined the band.

On December 1, 2009, Punchine released a digital collection of unreleased songs called Night Lights.

2010–2011: Delightfully Pleased
Beginning in May, Punchline went to Ohio to record with Jamie Woolford at Innovation Studios. Somewhere around this time, the former drummer, Dee, was let go from the band. Cory Muro, of Paul Menotiades' other band The Composure, also a Pittsburgh, PA band, is Pat's replacement.

A couple of weeks after their recording sessions were completed, Punchline released a song for fans of the television series Lost, a single rough mix track entitled "Roller Coaster Smoke". The track was released on the day of the Lost series finale. The official music video was released on July 23, 2010. It was directed by the Pittsburgh filmmaker and comedian Joe DeWitt.

On June 24, Punchline revealed that the new album would be called Delightfully Pleased and it would be released on August 10, by Modern Short Stories and TDR Records. The artwork was also released and the first song, "21 Forever", was released on their newly relaunched web site, PunchKids.com, on July 18. According to the band, this was their best album yet.

2012–2015: So Nice to Meet You and Thrilled
On January 3, 2012, Punchline released a new EP exclusively on iTunes called So Nice To Meet You. The band had a social media push to get to No. 1 on the iTunes charts. On January 4, 2012, the album peaked at No. 7 on iTunes Overall charts and No. 1 in the Rock category. So Nice to Meet You also reached No. 4 on Billboard'''s Heatseekers charts, No. 29 Rock Albums, No. 16 Independent Albums and No. 23 Alternative Albums. Punchline appeared on the Fox reality television show Mobbed broadcast on April 1, 2012. Soboslai performed the Cheap Trick classic "I Want You to Want Me" with a flash mob for a long-distance friend Dana to profess his interest in a relationship.

On January 19, 2015, Punchline announced their seventh full-length record titled "Thrilled" via their Facebook page with a release window of 2015. On March 10, 2015, a music video for the single "Thrilled" off the upcoming album "Thrilled" was released on Chris Fafalios's (the band's bassist) YouTube channel.

In December 2015, Punchline launched two full album streams  ahead of the album release and embarked on a 5-city tour in support of their newest album Thrilled'', briefly joining Bayside's Holiday tour  for a Philadelphia date.

2017–2018: Punchline Music Special Kickstarter and LION
On April 13, 2017, the Kickstarter to create a Punchline Music Special was successfully funded. On November 15, 2017, Punchline concluded filming of the live music portion of the Special in their hometown of Pittsburgh, PA.

Punchline announced a new full-length record titled "Lion" the next year, shortly before releasing the album which includes previous singles "Darkest Dark" (ft Matt Thiessen) and "It's an New Year (Don't Be So Hard on Yourself)." For the release, Dancing Gnome Beer created a limited edition Punchlion IPA, clocking in at 7% abv and hopped with Citra, Simcoe, Amarillo, Mosaic, Ekuanot, Columbus, and Chinook hops. It was presented on tap at the 3/31 Mr. Smalls Theatre "Lion" album release show and available for purchase at the brewery.

Punchline also performed at a TEDxPittsburgh event called "Small Worlds, Big Ideas" on June 16, 2018.
The band is currently on tour with The Spill Canvas and Selfish Things to support the Spill Canvas's new EP release ("Part of the Hive" tour). Punchline took time in between dates to play a show with 1990s rock heroes Gin Blossoms and Tonic in Pittsburgh.

2019-21: Touring, covers, and new releases 

In February 2019 Punchline continued to play with Gin Blossoms to support the New Miserable Experience 25th Anniversary Tour.

Throughout 2019 the band released a cover of Less Than Jake's “Automatic”, an album titled "Songs From 94", and a cover of the Ghostbusters theme song via Cleopatra Records.

In 2020 released the "Just Stay Home" single commemorating the Covid-19 pandemic with fan footage, as well as the Punchline Music Special (later available on Amazon Prime streaming). Punchline continued the release schedule with a 2021 single "Be Right There" produced by Marc McClusky and a new holiday original song “I Won’t Let You Down (This Christmas)" in 2021, rounding out their collection of Christmas songs.

Touring
Punchline has toured the United States extensively. In spring 2005, they embarked on their first proper headlining tour, "The Now or Never Tour". Notable acts they shared the stage with at this time include Catch 22, Allister, Spitalfield, Hidden In Plain View, The Fold, Audio Karate, Less Than Jake, Mest, Start Trouble, and MxPx.

In June 2009, Punchline co-headlined the Major/Minor Tour with Socratic.

In September 2009, Punchline set out on the AbsolutePunk Next Favorite Band Tour with Farewell, Between The Trees, and Action Item. They toured with Hawthorne Heights, Just Surrender, Monty Are I and Nightbeast during Hawthorne Heights' 2009 Never Sleep Again tour.

Internationally, the band has a sizable following in Japan. In summer 2004, Punchline toured Japan with then-labelmates Fall Out Boy, and, in June 2006, they headlined a Japanese tour with support from Paramore and October Fall.

In May 2007, Punchline toured the United Kingdom for the first time as a supporting act on the Good To Go Tour 2007 with rotating headliners Wheatus, MC Lars and Army Of Freshmen.

In February 2008, Punchline toured the UK again with MxPx and The Get Go on the fourth installment of the Good To Go Tour.

In 2019, Punchline toured the Eastern U.S. with Less Than Jake.

Members
Steve Soboslai – vocals, guitar (1998–present)
Chris Fafalios – bass guitar, vocals (1998–present)
Trevor Leonard –  guitar, vocals (2015–present)
Cory Muro – drums, vocals (2010–present)

Former members
Greg Wood –  guitar, vocals (2005-2006)
PJ Caruso – drums (1998–2009)
Jon Belan – guitar, vocals, keyboards (2006-2009)
Pat Dee – drums, percussion (2009–2010)
Paul Menotiades – guitar, vocals (1999–2005, 2009–2013)

Discography

Albums

EPs

Compilations

References

Other sources

External links
 Official website

American emo musical groups
Fueled by Ramen artists
Musical groups established in 1998
Musical groups from Pittsburgh
Pop punk groups from Pennsylvania